Nyaneka or Haneca is a Bantu language of Angola. The Ngambwe "dialect" is now considered a distinct language.

SAMPLE TEXT

Okulikuambela apeho,” oyo onkhalelo tupondola okulekesa okuti tuna ekolelo liotyotyili

TRANSLATION

To “pray constantly” in this way shows we have genuine faith

References

Southwest Bantu languages
Languages of Angola